was the last part of the Rescue Police Series trilogy in Toei Company's Metal Hero Series franchise of the superhero TV series. It aired in Japan from February 2, 1992, to January 24, 1993.

Exceedraft
: Exceedraft team leader, 24 years old, and an Interpol inspector. He speaks five languages and practices sports. To uphold justice, he challenges his limits. His Try Jacket is red.
 is a 24-year-old Exceedraft member and is skilled at investigating. He is a humanitarian, even though he is impassive with his weapon. He fights crime to restore the familiar bonds, trying to seek forgiveness for having lost his parents during childhood. Other than that, he is a master of disguise. He has a blue Try Jacket.
: Exceedraft's youngest member is 23 years old and skilled in martial arts.  He is the superintendent of the Fire Brigade, as well as of the police. An influent person, he won the karate tournament when he was at school. Despite his sporty attitude, he becomes extremely serious when facing evil. He enjoys cooking as well. His Try Jacket is yellow.
: Exceedraft's communication officer and police inspector; she also helps the team in fighting. 22 years old. When the cases occur, she operates the computer to back up the Exceedraft Team members. She has a brilliant mind and excels in sports, especially Kendo.
 once was a member of Interpol (ICPO). He is Exceedraft's General Manager. By appearance, he looks carefree, but, when the cases occur, he gives precise instructions to the members. He is 54 years old and his hobby is fishing. He appreciates Rōkyoku. During the top-secret mission during Episodes 11-18, he had traveled to his ICPO old haunt. 
 is 50 years old. He is Exceedraft's superintendent supervisor and served as the deputy general manager of Katsuragi, who went to Paris on a top-secret mission in Episodes 11-18.

Other characters
 is Ai's 10-year-old younger brother. Like his sister, he practices Kendo. He encountered Akiba many times in the incident in charge, like when he was taken captive by Togo (episode 44) or by God's Santa (ep 43 & 44). In the final episode, he was alongside his sister Ai during the duel between Hayato and Daimon.
: A special investigator from the Committee to Eradicate Terrorism in Latin America, he was killed in harness and a space lifeform transferred with his body. As for the space life body which transferred with the space criminal investigator who chases the younger brother, Carlos Togo, who became a space criminal. 
 - Former Winspector and Solbrain chief.
 - A mysterious girl that appears often in front of Hayato. Her true form is Michael, an angel sent by God. She has received the mission to protect a part of the human race (only children) from Daimon's evil hands to make that human beings could survive as species. Although ruthless ad cold for individual human beings, Originally, she did not care about sacrificing nonhumans to protect human beings as well the children's feelings. For example, trying to obliterate the Team Exceedraft against God's will as a person, she cannot choose the means if for the purpose, as well as showing off her power in the Exceedraft's headquarters at that time she remarked looking down on humankind, that they do not follow the God's will as a matter of course and are not aware of it. However, she changed her mind and regenerated Hayato after his battle against Daimon. She operates as Santa Claus' messenger.

Enemies
: An international terrorist. He shot David Akiba to death, but the latter had his body possessed by a space lifeform. Actually, he is David's younger brother. He was on the wrong path due to the matter of losing his parents due to a crime, he has been engaged in a deathmatch with his brother, that was an investigator. However, he is burdened by the feelings of his brother, shedding tears even preventing him from committing suicide by throwing off.
: - The president of Daimon Concern. He first appeared in Episode 33. He often started to challenge the Exceedraft Team. His true form is a demon. To win the "battle between God and the Devil", he recurred to every means (33, 34, 43, 44, & 47-49). He could manipulate his opponents using psychological attacks (In this case, for some reason, it becomes an eloquent tone). Being skilled in fighting, in the last episode, he overpowered Hayato, only to disappear being blown off to the Earth, which has been an incandescent hell, after being struck by Hayato's Cyclone Nova, right after the Earth went back to normal.

Weapons
: Exceedraft Team's weapon. It can be used in 3 different modes, how is mounted. These are Hyper Blast Mode, Thunder Grenade Mode, and Freeze Laser Mode, even its cartridge is just a normal weapon's cartridge.
: A special baton used by the Exceedraft team.
: Exceedraft's Transformation Device. Multi-purpose compact radio used by Exceedraft members. it can be used for voice communication, encrypted communication using the buttons, with functions such as remote control of the SIM spacecraft information. Connecting it into the Access Lock Catcher near the seat of the Scramhead or of the Varias 7 will move the seat to the armored hangar of the vehicle to equip the Try Jacket armors.
: A portable water cannon installed on the hangar of the Scramhead.
: An Accelerator mounted on the armor's ankle. The turbine can spin at high speed and run at Mach 1 approximated speed and the jumping power is boosted to 100 meters.
: An Equipment shield-like to make Turbo Unit W's performance more efficient. 
: A scalpel-shaped laser sword, used by Redder. It can be stored in the Guardler. Is frequently used in close combat, shrinking the portion of its blade, can also be loaded with the Heavy Cyclone.
: A Rescue Tool that appears in the middle of the series. It changes the equipment power by replacing a unit with one of its modes: Drill mode or Disk Mode (used when a person is blocked in the elevator for example). On the other hand, the power is boosted 10 times when is combined with the Reovolback G-3 and it is used as Revol Driving Mode.
: The Badge used by the Exceedraft Team. It contains a data chip to provide quick data required for investigation and rescue activities. Its system is similar to Solbrain's Solindicater or Winspector's SP License, but differently from the previous shows, the badges appeared after Episode 25. 
: A multi-purpose firearm developed specifically for SyncRedder. The cartridges used are "Magnum", "Gel"(with the same functions as Pile Tornado's Caulking Puncher), and "Vulcan", loading it with the E.M-Blade, it can perform the  hissatsu.

Try Jackets
 (Redder): Special armor which has the specialty in being resistant to impacts and bulletproof.
: The enhanced version of the Try Jackets, upgraded by Ai Hyuuga after a crushing defeat, that appeared in the second half of the series (Episode 33). The Try Jackets are powered-up are specialized in rescue-oriented functions, with an emphasis on combat. Blues' and Keace's Try Jackets have an aesthetically minor change, with white bands on the arms and on the legs. A similar version of Redder's Try Jacket with these minor changes appeared in Episode 35. Sometimes, prior to this upgrade, the Varias 7 was immediately deployed and Blues and Keace started to implement these upgraded suits inside the Scramhead.
: Redder's upgraded Try Jacket with a changed design, known also as SyncRedder. Differently from the Enhanced TryJackets, the Battle Jacket has 2 white stripes on each leg and arm. SyncRedder's helmet is equipped with two gates as Shock Guns for criminal repression. 
 (Blues): Special armor which has the ability to absorb electricity and has a high capacity for investigations.
 (Keace): Special heat-resistant armor which is capable of firefighting and is well adapted to rescues.

Vehicles
: Redder, Blues and Keace's SUV, a modified, armor-clad Chevrolet K5 Blazer. It is extremely fast and runs well even on bad roads. The armor's wallet is stored inside of it, being mounted externally. When Redder uses it, he gets into the vehicle and the seat moves to the armored top on the back of Scramhead, where the armor is mounted. The armored wings are attached outside the car.
: SyncRedder's car, a modified Chevrolet Corvette C4. It is equipped with seven functions (Access Radar, Hyper Searchlight, Hydlide Cannon, Break Laser, Multi-Anchor, Hover Speeder, and Grenade Shooter). Patrol and emergency modes are used, depending on the situation.
: The team's satellite that floats in earth's orbit. Is operated by Ai. It can track the crime scene and even a radio signal from  Access Lock S. The top of the fuselage is equipped with a laser cannon. In addition, it can also display the database of various weapons and criminal databases.
Undercover Personnel Cars: a Yellow car and a Black car, both Autozam AZ-3.

Episode list
 : written by Junichi Miyashita, directed by Kaneharu Mitsumura
 : written by Junichi Miyashita, directed by Kaneharu Mitsumura
 : written by Junichi Miyashita, directed by Michio Konishi
 : written by Junichi Miyashita, directed by Michio Konishi
 : written by Kyoko Sagiyama, directed by Kiyoshi Arai
 : written by Takashi Yamada, directed by Kiyoshi Arai
 : written by Junichi Miyashita, directed by Kaneharu Mitsumura
 : written by Junichi Miyashita, directed by Kaneharu Mitsumura
 : written by Nobuo Ogizawa, directed by Masao Minowa
 : written by Naoyuki Sakai, directed by Masao Minowa
 : written by Junichi Miyashita, directed by Michio Konishi
 : written by Junichi Miyashita, directed by Michio Konishi
 : written by Takahiko Masuda, directed by Kaneharu Mitsumura
 : written by Naoyuki Sakai, directed by Kaneharu Mitsumura
 : written by Nobuo Ogizawa, directed by Masao Minowa
 : written by Takashi Yamada, directed by Masao Minowa
 : written by Kyoko Sagiyama, directed by Michio Konishi
 : written by Mutsumi Nakano, directed by Michio Konishi
 : written by Junichi Miyashita, directed by Kaneharu Mitsumura
 : written by Junichi Miyashita, directed by Kaneharu Mitsumura
 : written by Junichi Miyashita and Tatsuoki Hosono, directed by Masao Minowa
 : written by Junichi Miyashita and Tatsuoki Hosono, directed by Masao Minowa
 : written by Nobuo Ogizawa, directed by Michio Konishi
 : written by Mutsumi Nakano, directed by Michio Konishi
 : written by Junichi Miyashita, directed by Kaneharu Mitsumura
 : written by Junichi Miyashita, directed by Kaneharu Mitsumura
 : written by Naoyuki Sakai, directed by Masao Minowa
 : written by Junichi Miyashita, directed by Michio Konishi
 : written by Junichi Miyashita, directed by Michio Konishi
 : written by Takahiko Masuda, directed by Kaneharu Mitsumura
 : written by Naoyuki Sakai, directed by Kaneharu Mitsumura
 : written by Nobuo Ogizawa, directed by Masao Minowa
 : written by Junichi Miyashita, directed by Masao Minowa
 : written by Junichi Miyashita, directed by Masao Minowa
 : written by Nobuo Ogizawa, directed by Michio Konishi
 : written by Naoyuki Sakai, directed by Michio Konishi
 : written by Mutsumi Nakano, directed by Kaneharu Mitsumura
 : written by Junichi Miyashita, directed by Kaneharu Mitsumura
 : written by Kyoko Sagiyama, directed by Masao Minowa
 : written by Junichi Miyashita, directed by Masao Minowa
 : written by Nobuo Ogizawa, directed by Hidenori Ishida
 : written by Naoyuki Sakai, directed by Hidenori Ishida
 : written by Junichi Miyashita, directed by Michio Konishi
 : written by Junichi Miyashita, directed by Michio Konishi
 : written by Takahiko Masuda, directed by Kaneharu Mitsumura
 : written by Nobuo Ogizawa, directed by Kaneharu Mitsumura
 : written by Junichi Miyashita and Yasuyuki Suzuki, directed by Masao Minowa
 : written by Junichi Miyashita and Yasuyuki Suzuki, directed by Masao Minowa
 : written by Junichi Miyashita and Yasuyuki Suzuki, directed by Masao Minowa

Cast
: 
: 
: 
: 
: 
: 
: 
: 
: 
: 
: 
: 
: 
: 
Narrator (Episode 15-20): 
Narrator (Episode 21-49)/Ryuichi Takaoka (47 - archive footage):

Guest stars
: 
: 
: 
: 
: 
: 
: 
: 
: 
: 
: 
: 
: 
: 
//Katsuhiko Sasamoto (47 - archive footage): 
: 
: 
/Brian (voice, 47 - archive footage): 
: 
: 
: 
: 
: 
: 
: 
: 
(voice):  
: 
: 
: 
: 
: 
: 
: 
: 
: 
: 
: 
: 
: 
: 
: 
: 
: 
: 
1x1 (Episode 21): 
: 
: 
: 
: 
: 
: 
: 
: 
: 
: 
:  (credited as )
: 
: 
: 
: 
:   
: 
: 
: 
: 
: 
: 
: 
: 
: 
: 
: 
: 
: 
: 
: 
: 
: 
: 
: 
: 
: 
: 
: 
: 
: 
: , 
: 
: 
: 
: 
: 
: 
: 
: 
: 
: , Toshimichi Takahashi
: 
: 
: 
: 
: 
: 
: 
: 
:

Crew
Created by Saburō Yatsude
Scripts: Junichi Miyashita, Tatsuoki Hosono, Yasuyuki Suzuki, Takashi Yamada, Naoyuki Sakai, Nobuo Ōgizawa, Takahiko Masuda, Mutsumi Nakano, Kyōko Sagiyama
Original Music by Kaoru Mizuki
Photography: Susumu Seo, Takakazu Koizumi
Assistant Directors: Hidenori Ishida, Masashi Taniguchi, Kenji Koyama
Action directors: Junji Yamaoka, Jun Murakami
Special effects director: Nobuo Yajima
Produced by Kyōzō Utsunomiya, Atsushi Kaji (TV Asahi), Nagafumi Hori (Toei)
Directed by Kaneharu Mitsumura, Michio Konishi, Kiyoshi Arai, Masao Minowa, Hidenori Ishida
Production: TV Asahi, ASATSU, Toei

Songs
Opening theme

Lyrics: 
Composition: 
Arrangement: 
Artist: 
Ending theme

Lyrics: Keisuke Yamakawa
Composition: Kisaburō Suzuki
Arrangement: Tatsumi Yano
Artist: Takayuki Miyauchi

Notes

References

External links
 

1992 Japanese television series debuts
1993 Japanese television series endings
Fictional police officers
Metal Hero Series
Television series set in 2001
TV Asahi original programming